Si Maha Phot is a district (amphoe) in the southern part of Prachinburi province, eastern Thailand. The name may also be spelled Sri Maha Bodhi, and honours the Bodhi tree (ต้นพระศรีมหาโพธิ์.)

Geography
Neighbouring districts are (from the west clockwise): Si Mahosot, Mueang Prachinburi, Prachantakham, Kabin Buri of Prachinburi Province; Phanom Sarakham and Sanam Chai Khet of Chachoengsao province.

Economy
Tambon Hua Wa in the district is the site of Rojana Industrial Park. Among other tenants of the park, Honda Automobile (Thailand) has established a 17.2 billion baht plant there to manufacture sub-compact vehicles. The plant, opened in March 2016, has an initial production capacity of 60,000 vehicles per year. The plant is designed to build up to 120,000 vehicles per year.

Environment
The air quality in the district in 2018 was the eighth worst in Thailand.

Administration
The district is divided into 10 sub-districts (tambons), which are further subdivided into 91 villages (mubans). There are two townships (thesaban tambons): Si Maha Phot covers parts of tambons Si Maha Phot and Nong Phrong, and Krok Sombun covers parts of Krok Sombun. There are a further seven tambon administrative organizations (TAO).

References

External links
amphoe.com

Si Maha Phot